Sparling is a surname. Notable people with the surname include:

Chris Sparling (born 1977), American screenwriter, film director and actor
Gordon Sparling (1900–1994), Canadian film director
Jack Sparling (1916–1997), American comics artist
John Sparling (born 1938), New Zealand cricketer
Joshua Sparling (born 1981), United States Army soldier

See also

O'Grady v. Sparling, a Supreme Court of Canada case